Simeon H. Anderson (March 2, 1802 – August 11, 1840) was a slave owner and United States Representative from Kentucky. He was born near Lancaster, Kentucky, where he pursued preparatory studies. In addition, he studied law and was admitted to the bar in 1823 and commenced practice in Lancaster, Kentucky.

Anderson was a member of the Kentucky House of Representatives 1828, 1829, 1832, and 1836–1838. He was elected as a Whig to the Twenty-sixth Congress and served from March 4, 1839, until his death near Lancaster, Kentucky, in 1840. He was buried in the Anderson family cemetery, with a cenotaph at the Congressional Cemetery.

Anderson was the father of William Clayton Anderson who also served as a Representative from Kentucky, and Margaret Anderson Watts, social reformer.

See also
List of United States Congress members who died in office (1790–1899)

References

1802 births
1840 deaths
People from Garrard County, Kentucky
Whig Party members of the United States House of Representatives from Kentucky
Members of the Kentucky House of Representatives